The Regional Municipality of Niagara, also colloquially known as the Niagara Region or Region of Niagara, is a regional municipality comprising twelve municipalities of Southern Ontario, Canada. The regional seat is in Thorold. It is the southern end of the Golden Horseshoe, the largest megalopolis in Canada.

The region occupies most of the Niagara Peninsula. Its eastern boundary is the Niagara River, which is also the border with the US State of New York. It is bounded on the north by Lake Ontario and on the south by Lake Erie.

Unique natural landscapes make the Niagara Region an important centre for agriculture and tourism in Canada. The most important agricultural enterprise in Niagara is viticulture, or winemaking. The Niagara Wine Route, which connects visitors to dozens of wineries, is a growing tourism draw while the internationally renowned Niagara Falls is one of Canada's major tourist attractions.  Along with Shaw Festival, held annually in Niagara-on-the-Lake, and the Welland Canal, the Regional Municipality of Niagara receives up to 12 million visitors each year.

Administrative divisions

Demographics

Historic populations:
 Population in 2001: 410,574
 Population in 1996: 403,504

Religion 
Religious profile
43.2% Protestant
36.4% Roman Catholic
14.6% Non-religious
3.8% other Christian
0.9% Muslim

Ethnicity 
Top ten largest ethnicities
Canadian - 121,660
English - 108,425
Scottish - 66,385
Irish - 56,640
German - 49,435
French - 48,155
Italian - 44,645
Dutch - 23,805
Ukrainian - 16,735
Polish - 16,295

Features

Education

Brock University (St. Catharines)
 Conseil Scolaire Viamonde - French Public
 District School Board of Niagara - Public
 Niagara Catholic District School Board - Separate
Niagara College (Niagara-on-the-Lake, Welland)
Niagara Parks School of Horticulture (Niagara Falls, Ontario)

Festivals and major events
Canada Games - 2022
Canal Days (Port Colborne)
Festival of Lights
FISA World Rowing Championships - 1970 & 1999
Shaw Festival
Niagara Pumphouse Arts Centre - Art at the Pumphouse (August Civic Holiday weekend)
Niagara Folk Arts Festival (St. Catharines)
Niagara Grape and Wine Festival
Niagara Greek Festival
Music Niagara Series (NOTL)
New Year's Eve at Niagara Falls
Twenty Valley Winter Winefest
Niagara Food & Wine Expo (Niagara Falls)
Niagara Icewine Festival (NOTL)
Niagara Integrated Film Festival (NOTL)
Niagara New Vintage Festival (NOTL)
Niagara Parks - Coca-Cola Concert Series (Niagara Falls)
Rib fest
Jazz Festival
SCENE Music Festival
Buskerfest
Royal Canadian Henley Regatta
St. Catharines Wine Tasting of 2005
Niagara-on-the-lake Peach Festival
Friendship Festival (Fort Erie)
Bravo Niagara Festival of Arts (NOTL)
Marshville Heritage Festival (Wainfleet)
Serbian Day (Vidovdan)
NOTL Ghost Walks
Niagara Falls Comic Con (Niagara Falls)
Welland FloatFest
Welland Zombie Walk
West Niagara Fair

Health care services
Hotel Dieu Shaver Health and Rehabilitation Centre
Niagara Health System

History and trails
Bruce Trail
Fort George National Historic Site (Niagara-on-the-Lake)
Annual Fife & Drum Muster and Soldiers Field Days - Fort George
Fort Mississauga National Historic Site (Niagara-on-the-Lake)
Niagara Parks - Siege of Fort Erie Re-enactment
Chippawa Battlefield Park
Greater Niagara Circle Route
Merritt Island (Welland)
Morningstar Mill (St. Catharines)
Navy Island National Historic Site (Niagara Falls)
Niagara Parkway
Niagara Wine Route
Old Fort Erie (Fort Erie)
Queenston Heights National Historic Site (Niagara-on-the-Lake)
Old Ivy Walk
Waterfront Trail
Friendship Trail
Welland Canal Parkway
Balls Falls Conservation Area (Thanksgiving Festival)
Niagara Botanical Gardens
Daredevil Exhibit
Drummond Hill Cemetery
Dufferin Islands
Battle Ground Hotel Museum
Niagara Falls Museum
Niagara Historical Society Museum
Niagara Falls Underground Railroad Heritage Centre
Fort Erie Museums
Graffiti Alley
Bertie Hall

Notable people
Paul Bissonnette, former NHL player
James Cameron, film director
Linda Evangelista, fashion supermodel
Daniel Girardi, former NHL player
Dallas Green, musician and producer known as "City and Colour"
Tim Hicks, musician
Nathan Horton, former NHL player
Stephan Moccio, Grammy and Academy award-winning musician and composer
Jordan Nolan, former NHL player
Daniel Paille, former NHL player
Neil Peart (1952-2020), drummer for the band Rush
Laura Secord, heroine of War of 1812
Joel Thomas Zimmerman, musician known as "Deadmau5"
Imane Anys, Twitch streamer who goes by the name "Pokimane"

Other
Scotiabank Convention Centre (Niagara Falls)
Clifton Hill (Niagara Falls)
Lundy's Lane Tourist District (Niagara Falls)
Niagara Olde Town (Niagara-on-the-Lake)
Port Dalhousie (St. Catharines)
 Safari Niagara (Fort Erie)
Victoria Ave (Niagara Falls)
Welland Canal Centre (St. Catharines)
Howell Family Pumpkin Farm (Fonthill)

Protected areas

Short Hills Provincial Park
Wainfleet Bog Provincial Wildlife Preserve
Ball's Falls Conservation Area
Chippawa Creek Conservation Area
Long Beach Conservation Area
Morgan's Point Conservation Area
Cave Springs Conservation Area
St. John's Conservation Area
Rockway Conservation Area
Louth Conservation Area
Mountainview Conservation Area
Beamer Memorial Conservation Area
Woodend Conservation Area

Woolverton Conservation Area
Wainfleet Wetlands
Humberstone & Willoughby Wetlands
Mud Lake Wetlands
E.C. Brown Conservation Area
United Empire Loyalist Conservation Area
Port Davidson Weir Conservation Area
Sugar Bush Conservation Area
Stevensville Conservation Area
Virgil Dams Conservation Area
Happy Rolph's Bird Sanctuary
Niagara Glen Nature Reserve

Wineries
West Niagara
Cave Spring Cellars
Fielding
Flatrock
Henry of Pelham Family Estate Winery - St. Catharines, Ontario c. 1980s
Hernder Estate Wines
Peninsula Ridge
Vineland Estate

East Niagara
Chateau des Charmes
Coyote's Run
Hillebrand Winery - Niagara-on-the-Lake, Ontario c.1979
Inniskillin - Niagara-on-the-Lake, Ontario c.1974
Marynissen
Pillitteri Estates Winery

See also Niagara Peninsula wineries

Transportation

Airports
Niagara Region contains three airports used primarily for general aviation:
St. Catharines/Niagara District Airport (Niagara-on-the-Lake)
Welland/Niagara Central Airport (Welland)
Niagara Falls/Niagara South Airport (Niagara Falls)

Aside from scheduled commuter flights between Niagara District Airport and Toronto City with FlyGTA, for commercial flights Niagara residents use Toronto Pearson International Airport, Billy Bishop Toronto City Airport, or John C. Munro Hamilton International Airport in the Greater Toronto and Hamilton Area; as well as crossing the border to use Buffalo Niagara International Airport or Niagara Falls International Airport in Upstate New York.

Public Transport
Niagara Region is served by GO Transit and Niagara Region Transit, as well as the following local bus operators:
 Niagara Falls Transit
 St. Catharines Transit (also serves Thorold)
 Welland Transit (also serves Port Colborne)
 Fort Erie Transit
 Niagara-on-the-Lake Transit

Grimsby, Pelham, Wainfleet, Lincoln and West Lincoln do not have local transit systems.

Highways
400-Series expressways:
 Highway 405
 Highway 406
 Highway 420
 Queen Elizabeth Way (QEW)

Other highways:
 Highway 3
 Highway 20
 Highway 58
 Highway 58A
 Highway 140

See also
 List of municipalities in Ontario
 List of townships in Ontario

Notes

References

External links

 
Niagara
Populated places on Lake Erie in Canada